The Little Finnup House, located at 401 N. Ninth St. in Garden City, Kansas, was built in 1886.  It was listed on the National Register of Historic Places in 2000.

It is a two-story Italianate-style structure with a front-facing T-Plan.

It was deemed notable "for its historical association with George W. Finnup, a member of Garden City's most prominent pioneer family, businessman, community leader and philanthropist (1866 -1937) and for its architectural significance as an Italianate style house."

References

External links

Houses on the National Register of Historic Places in Kansas
Italianate architecture in Kansas
Houses completed in 1886
Finney County, Kansas